Áed mac Conchobair (died 888)  was a King of Connacht from the Uí Briúin branch of the Connachta. He was the son of Conchobar mac Taidg Mór (died 882), the previous king and was the first of his three sons to rule in succession. He was of the Síl Muiredaig sept of the Uí Briúin. He ruled from 882-888.

Áed's reign was involved in conflict with the Vikings. In 887 the Connachta inflicted a slaughter on the Vikings of Limerick. In 888 Áed met his death at the Battle of the Settlers where the high king Flann Sinna (died 916) was defeated by the Vikings of Dublin.

Notes

References

 Annals of Ulster at CELT: Corpus of Electronic Texts at University College Cork
 Chronicum Scotorum at CELT: Corpus of Electronic Texts at University College Cork
 Byrne, Francis John (2001), Irish Kings and High-Kings, Dublin: Four Courts Press,

External links
CELT: Corpus of Electronic Texts at University College Cork

Kings of Connacht
888 deaths
9th-century Irish monarchs
O'Conor dynasty
Year of birth unknown